KSG College of Arts and Science  is an arts and science institute in Coimbatore, Tamil Nadu, India. It was founded in 2001 by K. S. Gita. It is an institution of higher learning, offering 11 undergraduate courses in science, humanities, and commerce and 2 postgraduate courses in science and management.

External links

Universities and colleges in Coimbatore
Educational institutions established in 2001
2001 establishments in Tamil Nadu